Kalgoorlie is a city in the Goldfields–Esperance region of Western Australia.

Kalgoorlie may also refer to:

 Division of Kalgoorlie, a federal division of the Australian House of Representatives
 Electoral district of Kalgoorlie, an electoral district of the Western Australian Legislative Assembly
 Kalgoorlie (suburb), a suburb of the Kalgoorlie–Boulder metropolitan area
 The Kalgoorlie, a train service operated by the Western Australian Government Railways 1962–1971